Gianluca Vialli  (9 July 1964 – 6 January 2023) was an Italian football player and manager who played as a striker. Vialli started his club career at his hometown club Cremonese in 1980, where he made 105 league appearances and scored 23 goals. His performances impressed Sampdoria who signed him in 1984, and with whom he scored 85 league goals, won three Italian cups, Serie A and the European Cup Winners Cup.

In 1992, Vialli transferred to Juventus for a world record £12.5 million. During his time at the Turin club he won the Italian Cup, Serie A, Italian Supercup, UEFA Champions League and the UEFA Cup. In 1996 Vialli joined Chelsea and became their player-manager the following season. In England he won the FA Cup, League Cup, UEFA Cup Winners Cup and UEFA Super Cup. He is one of nine footballers to have won the three main European club competitions, and the only forward to have done so; he is also the only player in European footballing history to have both winners' and runners-up medals in all three main European club competitions, including two winners' medals for the UEFA Cup Winners' Cup.

At international level, Vialli represented the Italy national team in two FIFA World Cups, in 1986 and (on home soil) in 1990. He also took part at UEFA Euro 1988, helping his nation to a semi-final finish, and was elected to the team of the tournament. During his twenty-year-long career as a professional footballer he scored 259 goals at club level, 16 goals with the national team, and 11 goals with the Italy national under-21 football team, for a total of 286 goals in more than 500 appearances, making him the tenth-highest scoring Italian player in all competitions.

On his retirement from playing, Vialli went into management and later punditry, and worked as a commentator for Sky Italia. He was part of the Italy national team non-playing staff as a delegation chief when they won UEFA Euro 2020; he stepped back from this role days before his death from cancer.

Club career

Cremonese
Vialli's senior career started in 1980 when he signed for local club Cremonese in Serie C1, winning promotion to Serie B. After scoring ten goals for the club as a winger in the 1983–84 Serie B season, he was transferred to Sampdoria.

Sampdoria
At Sampdoria he formed a prolific strike partnership with teammate and friend Roberto Mancini, earning the nickname 'The Goal Twins' (in Italian I Gemelli del Gol). With Vialli at his best, Sampdoria had the most successful era in its history. They won their first ever Serie A championship in the 1990–91 season, in which Vialli was league top scorer with 19 goals – celebrating many of his goals with a backflip, including one against Inter Milan – one UEFA Cup Winners' Cup (1990) – where he scored both goals in the 2–0 win over Anderlecht in the final (once again finishing the tournament as top-scorer), and three Italian Cups (in 1985, 1988 and 1989), also setting a record of 13 goals in a single edition of the Coppa Italia during his time at the club. They also won a Supercoppa Italiana, and reached the final of the UEFA Supercup, and the European Cup final in 1992, losing to Johan Cruyff's Barcelona "Dream Team" of Spain 1–0.

Juventus
Vialli moved to Juventus shortly after the 1992 European Cup final loss for a world record fee of £12.5 million. Vialli won the UEFA Cup in his first season with Juventus playing alongside players such as Roberto Baggio, Pierluigi Casiraghi, Paolo Di Canio and Andreas Möller, among other players, under manager Giovanni Trapattoni. Following the arrival of manager Marcello Lippi, Vialli underwent an intense fitness and muscle strengthening training regime to lose weight, and gain speed, agility, physical strength, and stamina. Vialli refound his goalscoring form throughout the season, and through his leadership and decisive performances, he helped Juventus win the Scudetto (his second overall) and the Italian Cup in 1995, scoring 16 goals during the season; the club also narrowly missed out on a treble after suffering a defeat in the 1995 UEFA Cup Final to Parma, despite Vialli scoring a spectacular second leg goal. He ended his time in Turin by captaining the side to a Supercoppa Italiana victory and a Champions League final win over defending champions AFC Ajax in 1996, playing alongside Del Piero and Fabrizio Ravanelli. During his four seasons with the club he totalled 102 appearances, scoring 38 goals.

Chelsea
Vialli joined Chelsea in the summer of 1996 on a free transfer as part of manager Ruud Gullit's rebuilding of the side. Vialli adapted quickly to life in London due to his grasp of the English language and use of English idioms. The team won the FA Cup in Vialli's first season, with the Italian scoring two goals in a 4–2 comeback over Liverpool in the fourth round. However, a feud with Gullit saw him regularly left out of the starting line-up; in the final itself he was limited to a five-minute appearance as a late substitute.

During the 1997–98 season, Vialli scored four goals in a league win over Barnsley and a hat-trick against Norwegian side Tromsø in the Cup Winners' Cup, but still could not cement his place in the side under Gullit. However, following Gullit's dismissal in early 1998, Vialli assumed the role of a player-manager, winning the Cup Winners' Cup in 1998, and the League Cup. He followed these victories up with a 1–0 victory over Champions League winners Real Madrid in the UEFA Super Cup.

Vialli retired from professional football at the end of the 1998–99 season to focus on his position as Chelsea's manager. He made his last professional appearance in Chelsea's final match of the 1998–99 Premier League, scoring the winning goal against Derby County at Stamford Bridge.

Managerial career

Chelsea
Gullit was sacked as Chelsea manager in February 1998 and 33-year-old Vialli was appointed player-manager, becoming the first Italian to manage in the Premier League. Chelsea were already in the semi-finals of the League Cup and the quarter-finals of the European Cup Winners' Cup, and went on to win both competitions under Vialli, as well as finishing fourth in the Premier League. In beating VfB Stuttgart at the Cup Winners' Cup final on 13 May 1998, at 33 years and 308 days old, Vialli became the youngest manager ever to win a UEFA competition. The record stood for thirteen years until 18 May 2011 when FC Porto's André Villas-Boas won the Europa League at the age of 33 years and 213 days.

The following season Chelsea won the UEFA Super Cup by beating Real Madrid 1–0, and finished third in the Premier League, just four points behind champions Manchester United in what was Chelsea's highest league finish since 1970, when they also finished third.

Vialli made his final competitive appearance for the club against Derby County at the end of that season (a game in which he scored), finishing his Chelsea career with 83 appearances and 40 goals.

The following season saw Chelsea make their debut in the UEFA Champions League, where they reached the quarter-finals. After a 3–1 first leg victory over Barcelona, they were eventually knocked out 4–6 on aggregate following a 5–1 return leg loss at Camp Nou after extra time. Despite a fifth-place finish in the Premier League, the campaign ended on a high note when Vialli guided Chelsea to a win over Aston Villa in the 2000 FA Cup final.

The 2000–01 season started brightly, with Chelsea beating Manchester United to win the Charity Shield, Vialli's fifth official trophy with the club in less than three years. Vialli was sacked five games into the season after an indifferent start and having fallen out with several players, including Gianfranco Zola, Didier Deschamps and Dan Petrescu.

Watford
Vialli then took up an offer to manage First Division club Watford in 2001–02. Despite making wholesale and expensive changes to the playing and coaching staff, the Hertfordshire side finished an unimpressive 14th and Vialli was sacked after one year. Following this, he was drawn into a lengthy dispute with the club over the payment of the remainder of his contract.

International career

Vialli was a member of Italy's under-21 team for both the 1984 and 1986 UEFA European Under-21 Football Championships where the Azzurrini finished third and second respectively. Overall Vialli represented the Italy U21 team 20 times, scoring 11 goals. He was also the top scorer in the 1986 Under-21 European Championship, with 4 goals, where Italy lost the final to Spain on penalties.

In 1985, Vialli made his debut for the Italy senior team in a friendly match against Poland. He was included in Italy's squad for the 1986 FIFA World Cup held in Mexico, appearing with an all-shaved head as a substitute in all four of Italy's matches.

Vialli scored his first goal for Italy in a UEFA Euro 1988 qualifier against Malta in 1986. He was included in Italy's squad for the finals of the Euro 1988 competition and scored the winning goal against Spain in the group stage. Although Italy were knocked out by the Soviet Union in the semi-final after losing 0–2, Vialli was named in UEFA's team of the tournament.

With the 1990 FIFA World Cup being held on home soil, Vialli named part of the squad and he was expected to make a huge impact for the hosts. However, after failing to score in the first match against Austria, despite setting up the winning goal via a cross, Vialli missed a penalty against the United States in the next match, hitting the lower near post with keeper Tony Meola diving the other way. He was subsequently dropped from the team in favour of Roberto Baggio and Salvatore Schillaci, who had scored the winning goal against Austria after appearing as a substitute. Vialli returned to the team for the semi-final against Argentina and played a role in Italy's opening goal after his shot on goal was blocked by Argentina keeper Goycochea and the rebound fell to Schillaci. He was substituted in the second half as Italy were eliminated on penalties, eventually finishing the tournament in third place. Because Italy assigned jersey numbers alphabetically to players for the World Cup (beginning with defenders, then midfielders, and finally attackers) Vialli wore the number 21 during the World Cup. Overall, he finished the tournament with 2 assists, which were both provided for the golden boot winner Schillaci.

Vialli returned to lead Italy's attack during the qualifying games to the Euro 1992 Championship under Vicini, scoring in Italy's 3–1 win over Hungary and 2–0 win over Cyprus. However, Italy missed out on qualifying after finishing second behind the Soviet Union in Group 3.

Vialli made his last appearance for the Azzurri in December 1992; his strained relationship with coach Arrigo Sacchi brought his international career to a premature end, despite his club success during the 1990s. It is rumoured that Vialli played a prank on Sacchi, which was the reason for his dropping from the national team.

Overall, Vialli made 59 appearances for Italy, scoring 16 goals.

Style of play
Considered one of the best and most consistent Italian strikers of his generation, Vialli was a complete, dynamic, determined, and versatile forward, who was capable of playing anywhere along the front line; throughout his career, he was played on the wing, or in a deeper, supporting role, although his preferred position was in the centre as a main striker, where he could best take advantage of his offensive movement and opportunism inside the box, as well as his keen eye for goal. A prolific goalscorer, Vialli was known for his shooting power and accuracy with both feet as well as his head, which allowed him to finish off chances both inside and outside the penalty area. 

In addition to his ability to score goals, Vialli was also capable of playing off of and creating chances for his teammates, courtesy of his good vision, tactical intelligence, and distribution, which also occasionally saw him play in deeper roles in midfield, as a playmaker or attacking midfielder; he was also endowed with good technical ability, dribbling skills, and ball control, which allowed him to play the ball first time, or beat opponents and retain possession under pressure. A quick, tenacious, hardworking, and energetic player, Vialli was gifted with pace, physicality, and stamina, and was known for his willingness to press opponents off the ball to win back possession. Vialli was seen as a new breed of striker in Italian football, who combined technique and goalscoring ability with speed, athleticism, and physical power. 

Because of his outstanding athleticism, strength, and agility, he also excelled in the air, and had a penchant for scoring acrobatic goals from volleys and bicycle kicks, which led his Juventus manager Marcello Lippi and president Gianni Agnelli at the time to praise him and compare him to legendary Italian striker Gigi Riva. In addition to his footballing skills, he was also highly regarded for his dedication, leadership qualities, strong mentality, and his charismatic influence on the pitch. Marino Bortoletti of Treccani described Vialli as a "modern striker, gifted with power and style", and as "the most representative player of his generation", along with compatriots Roberto Baggio and Franco Baresi.

Other

In 2006, Vialli released The Italian Job: A Journey to the Heart of Two Great Footballing Cultures, co-written with his close friend and football journalist, Gabriele Marcotti. Written over a period of two-and-a-half years from November 2003 until early 2006, the book discusses the differences between English and Italian football. He also attributes his tendency to play as a wide attacker to playing on a field that was short and wide as a young boy. Vialli donated the proceeds of the book to the "Fondazione Vialli e Mauro per la ricerca e lo sport", which is a charitable foundation he founded together with former player Massimo Mauro to raise funds for research into cancer and amyotrophic lateral sclerosis (ALS).

From the late 2000s Vialli worked as a TV football commentator for Sky Italia. In 2007, he was linked with a move to the manager's position at Queens Park Rangers, following the club takeover by Flavio Briatore and Bernie Ecclestone and the dismissal of John Gregory as manager, but ultimately declined any interest in the job. During Euro 2012, he appeared as a pundit for the BBC's coverage of the tournament.

Vialli, alongside ex-Morgan Stanley and -Goldman Sachs investment banker Fausto Zanetton, co-founded Tifosy, a sports investment platform, with the aim of allowing anybody to invest in professional sports. Zanetton, its CEO, explained that "whilst there is an incredible passion and willingness to invest in sports, there is currently no way to do so for the average fan or investor...You no longer need to be a billionaire to invest in professional sports clubs." At Web Summit 2016, Vialli discussed his latest venture with Tifosy.

In October 2019, Vialli was appointed new delegation chief of the Italy national football team under head coach and personal friend Roberto Mancini (his former teammate and striking partner at Sampdoria), a position unfilled since Gigi Riva's retirement in 2013. On 11 July 2021, Italy won UEFA Euro 2020 after a 3–2 victory in a penalty shoot-out after a 1–1 draw after extra-time against England in the final.

Personal life and death
Son of a self-made millionaire, Vialli was brought up with his four siblings in the 60-room  in Cremona. He married Cathryn White-Cooper on 26 August 2003 and fathered two daughters, Olivia and Sofia. Vialli was a keen golfer and played at the Dunhill links championship pro-am event. He continued to live in the SW6 postcode of London 20 years after leaving Chelsea F.C.

In November 2018, Vialli revealed that he had successfully overcome a year-long illness with pancreatic cancer. He was treated at the Royal Marsden Hospital in London. He was given the all-clear from pancreatic cancer in April 2020, but in December 2021 revealed that he had been diagnosed with the disease for a second time. He died on 6 January 2023, in the Royal Marsden Hospital, at age 58.

Career statistics

Club

International

Managerial statistics

Honours

Player
Sampdoria
 Serie A: 1990–91
 Coppa Italia: 1984–85, 1987–88, 1988–89
 Supercoppa Italiana: 1991
 UEFA Cup Winners' Cup: 1989–90; runner-up: 1988–89
 European Cup runner-up: 1991–92

Juventus
 Serie A: 1994–95
 Coppa Italia: 1994–95
 Supercoppa Italiana: 1995
 UEFA Champions League: 1995–96
 UEFA Cup: 1992–93; runner-up: 1994–95

Chelsea
 FA Cup: 1996–97
 League Cup: 1997–98
 UEFA Cup Winners' Cup: 1997–98

Italy
FIFA World Cup third place: 1990

Individual
UEFA European Under-21 Championship top-scorer: 1986 (four goals)
UEFA European Championship Team of the Tournament: 1988
Coppa Italia top scorer: 1988–89 (13 goals)
UEFA Cup Winners' Cup top scorer: 1989–90 (seven goals)
Serie A top scorer: 1990–91 (19 goals)
World Soccer's World Player of the Year: 1995
Italian Football Hall of Fame: 2015
Premio internazionale Giacinto Facchetti: 2018

Manager
Chelsea
 FA Cup: 1999–2000
 League Cup: 1997–98
 FA Charity Shield: 2000
 UEFA Cup Winners' Cup: 1997–98
 UEFA Super Cup: 1998

Orders
  5th Class / Knight: Cavaliere Ordine al Merito della Repubblica Italiana: 1991

  3rd Class / Commander: Commendatore Ordine al Merito della Repubblica Italiana: 2021

References

External links

 

1964 births
2023 deaths
Sportspeople from Cremona
Association football forwards
Italian footballers
Italy international footballers
Italy under-21 international footballers
World Soccer Magazine World Player of the Year winners
U.S. Cremonese players
U.C. Sampdoria players
Juventus F.C. players
Chelsea F.C. players
Serie A players
Serie B players
Serie C players
Premier League players
Expatriate footballers in England
Italian expatriate sportspeople in England
Italian expatriate footballers
Italian football managers
Premier League managers
Expatriate football managers in England
Chelsea F.C. managers
Watford F.C. managers
1986 FIFA World Cup players
UEFA Euro 1988 players
1990 FIFA World Cup players
Italian expatriate football managers
UEFA Champions League winning players
UEFA Cup winning players
Italian association football commentators
Association football player-managers
Mass media people from Cremona
Footballers from Lombardy
FA Cup Final players
Commanders of the Order of Merit of the Italian Republic
Knights of the Order of Merit of the Italian Republic
Deaths from pancreatic cancer
Deaths from cancer in England